Bark isolates are chemicals which have been extracted from bark. Prominent medical examples are salicylic acid (active metabolite of aspirin) and paclitaxel (Taxol). The pharmacology of bark isolates is an ongoing topic of medical research.

See also

Notes 

Trees
Pharmaceutical isolates